Think Think and Ah Tsai are two cats belonging to the President of Taiwan, Tsai Ing-wen. Think Think is a female grey tabby, while Ah Tsai is a male ginger tabby.

Origin of the cats
Think Think was adopted by Tsai in 2012, after being brought to her as a homeless kitten by Democratic Progressive Party (DPP) legislator Hsiao Bi-khim.  Hsiao had found the kitten on a muddy road by a railway station near  Hualien after Typhoon Saola. Ah Tsai (meaning 'talent') was a farm cat, and a gift from a friend during Tsai's presidential campaign. The cat was found near a pineapple field in Taitung County in eastern Taiwan.

Prior to her election as president, Tsai lived in a modest apartment with the two cats. Think Think was originally skinny, covered in mud and suffering from skin diseases – but soon recovered under Tsai's care. Tsai says that the cats generally get along well with each other, but do fight occasionally.

Social media updates

During her presidency, Tsai has regularly posted social media updates which include her cats, and these are popular. During the COVID-19 pandemic, one of these posts discouraged Taiwanese citizens from performing April Fools' Day pranks which involved false rumours. Posting a picture of herself with one of the cats, she said: "...we can exercise our sense of humor...but we can’t make jokes about the pandemic, to avoid breaking the law", and: "I wish everybody not only a humorous, but also healthy and safe April Fools’ Day".

When baseball games resumed after Taiwan's pandemic lockdown was partially lifted, with the Chinatrust Brothers taking on the Uni-President 7-Eleven Lions, Tsai posted a picture of herself watching the game at home, accompanied by one of the cats. A new Twitter hashtag – #ThisAttackComeFromTaiwan – aims to welcome overseas visitors to Taiwan after the pandemic, and includes images of Taiwanese landscapes, bubble tea, and Tsai's cats.

In 2019, Tsai posted pictures on social media of Ah Tsai attentively watching television, and enjoying the Animal Channel. On Valentine's Day in 2019, Tsai's message to citizens featured the two cats. In the lead up to the 2020 election, Tsai advised her supporters to ignore 'fake news' about the cats' health, and that they were in fine form.

In July 2020, Tsai visited the Hsinchu Animal Protection Education Park, where she made a statement urging citizens who wanted pets to adopt stray animals, instead of purchasing them.

Media coverage

Supporters and critics
Shortly after Tsai was elected as president in 2016, she was criticised for being a single woman – and therefore 'emotional' and 'erratic' – in a newspaper article published by China's state news agency Xinhua. The article, written by Wang Weixing a military officer in the PLA, provoked an outcry for its sexist views, and was quickly withdrawn. On China's social media platform Sina Weibo, one commentator suggested that the Chinese leadership are "... probably threatened that a cat lady like Ms Tsai could beat any men she sets her mind to ...".

Taiwanese activist magazine New Bloom describes her as 'an unorthodox politician ... a female academic who loves cats and supports gay rights'. Gideon Rachman of the Financial Times observes that Tsai is one of two cat-lovers who have recently risen to power – the other being Jaroslaw Kaczynski, leader of Poland's ruling Law and Justice Party.

In June 2016, while in Miami, Tsai met Taiwanese professional baseball pitcher Wei-Yin Chen, whose gifts to her included feeding bowls for each of the two cats and three adopted dogs.

Three dogs – Bella, Bunny and Maru

After first being sworn in as president, Tsai also announced plans to adopt three retired guide dogs once she moves into her official residence. The media in Taiwan asked Tsai whether she anticipated any conflict with her cats, but she said that the dogs "are very well trained and they can definitely get along with the cats".

Other observers attempted to draw parallels with Taiwan's political situation. Alex Lo, writing in Hong Kong's South China Morning Post, has suggested that Tsai's adoption of the dogs is a good sign for relations between Taiwan and Mainland China. He proposes that the Taiwanese are 'cat people', while the mainland Chinese are 'dog people' – citing a psychological study indicating cat lovers are 11 per cent more open to 'unusual ideas', while dog people are more 'conventional and traditional'. In Singapore, The Straits Times dismissed as media speculation any suggestion of a 'civil war' between Tsai's cats and dogs.

Tsai adopted the dogs in October 2016, and their names are Bella, Bunny and Maru. She signed their adoption papers at a ceremony organised by the Huikuang Guide Dog Foundation, where she vowed to improve the barrier-free environment for visually impaired people and their seeing-eye dogs. Of the three dogs, Tsai has described Bella as her favourite; while Bunny is 'elegant' and Maru is 'timid'.

Election campaigns

2015–2016 

Think Think and Ah Tsai featured as part of Tsai's presidential campaign in 2015 and 2016, with the press sometimes referring to her as 'Cat Woman'. During the campaign, Tsai's Facebook pages on cat-related topics received many more hits than pages discussing policy issues – with the rate of 'likes' being up to 50 percent higher.

A page showing Ah Tsai receiving a vaccination on World Animal Day was especially popular, with nearly 30,000 'likes' (as of October 2015). Her campaign team produced an animated film, Cat in a Paper Carton – Think Think; and the feline also appeared in Light up Taiwan, a book outlining Tsai's political views.

Tsai's love of cats is well known among her supporters, and young people in particular are fans of the two cats. Her Chinese New Year video message in 2015 included a grey tabby cat  trying to break free from her arms. As part of her campaign, Tsai and her cats were transformed into anime video characters. The animated cartoon was not in Mandarin, the language promoted by the ROC government for decades, but Taiwanese, a language which was once scorned by Tsai's opponents, the previously dominant Kuomintang (KMT).

Davina Tham of the Taipei Times said that Tsai personifies the nation's attitudes toward women in power. Tham cites a comic strip created in 2016 by "Stupid Sheep" called Presidential Slave to Cats, portraying a cartoon likeness of Tsai juggling presidential duties with her devotion to Think Think and Ah Tsai. Tham also cites another cartoonist, Wei Tsung-cheng, who created Conquerer of the Seas, which portrays a young girl named Ing who grows up on a patriarchal island-nation; and overthrows oppressive forces which terrorise her people.

Celebrating Tsai's election victory, the national postal agency, Chunghua Post, created a special stamp issue. It featured people from all walks of life, along with a dog and a cat; and drew attention to issues of equality and cultural diversity in Taiwan. The pixelated faces of the President and Vice President were intended to express the idea that these are individuals who embody the collective spirit and style of the nation. Other icons represented various occupations, genders, social roles and ethnic groups. It was the first ever Taiwanese stamp not to feature the national flag.

2020 

Tsai's re-election campaign made use of both cat and dog imagery. Also included were videos of her frolicking with the two cats and three dogs. Taiwan News called one of her cats the "purrfect" running mate, and her supporters wore T-shirts calling the President a "slave to cats". A campaign store was set up, where visitors could take selfies with Tsai's dogs.

Tsai appeared wearing a pair of pink cat ears in a DPP campaign rally advertisement, which was posted on social media by Freddy Lim, frontman of death metal band Chthonic, and also himself a politician. Although Lim is founder of the New Power Party (NPP), he ran as an independent after a dispute about the NPP's relationship with the ruling DPP. Despite his role as an independent, Lim had been voicing his support for the DPP's Tsai Ing-wen.

Other publicity material in the Tsai campaign included a pillow in the shape of Taiwan, and  a hot sauce which was a pun on Tsai's "Hot Taiwanese Girl" nickname.

Tsai was mocked by the Chinese Communist Party for posting a cosplay "magic girls" avatar on Facebook. However, the Australian Broadcasting Corporation's China correspondent Bill Birtles says that Tsai's "cute" campaign style belies a much harder edge. The New Daily called her Taiwan's "Iron Cat Lady".

Writing for New Bloom, Brian Hioe suggested at least one was following Tsai's lead; highlighting main presidential rival Han Kuo-yu, who appeared with imagery of his pet Shiba Inu. Taiwan's Digital Minister, Audrey Tang, says that politicians using internet memes and cat pictures reflects a 'coming out' of digital subcultures.

After Tsai was elected to her second term, she was congratulated by the Hong Kong Cat Society, a cat welfare organisation, which issued a statement describing her victory as 'a win for cats'.

Feline culture in Taiwan

Cats are generally popular as pets in Taiwan, with the cat population increasing rapidly in recent years. The world's first cat café, named "Cat Flower Garden", opened in Taipei in 1998, and by 2016 there was also a "Cathy Hotel" especially for cats. The Taiwanese cat café concept spread to Japan, and later caught on in other countries around the world.

The former mining town of Houtong is known as a "cat village", which attracts tourists with its large population of roaming cats.

See also
 Taiwanese presidential pets
 List of individual cats

References 

2011 animal births
2016 animal births
Individual cats in politics
Political history of Taiwan